The Maskoŭskaja line (also referred to as Maskowskaya line or Moskovskaya line) (lit: "Moscow line") is a line of the Minsk Metro. The line was opened along with the Metro in 1984 with the original eight station segment, and crosses the city on a northeast–southwest axis.

Timeline

Transfers

Rolling stock
The line is served by the Moskovskoe depot (№ 1), and currently has 21 five carriage 81-717/714 and the modernised 81-717.5M/714.5M trains assigned to it.

Recent developments and future plans
A  5.2 km extension has been constructed to the southwest of the city and contains three stations: Hrushawka, Mikhalova, and Pyatrowshchyna. It was opened on November 7, 2012. 

The last extension was on June 3, 2014, when Malinawka was opened.

References

External links 
Minsk Metro

Minsk Metro
Railway lines opened in 1984